Ojārs is a Latvian masculine given name and may refer to:
Ojārs Arvīds Feldbergs (born 1947), Latvian sculptor
Ojārs Grīnbergs (1942–2016), Latvian singer
Ojārs Ēriks Kalniņš (1949–2021), Latvian politician and diplomat 
Ojārs Kehris (born 1956), Latvian politician
Ojārs Siliņš (born 1993), Latvian basketball player
Ojārs Vācietis (1933–1983), Latvian author

References

Latvian masculine given names